Levy, Lévy or Levies may refer to:

People 
 Levy (surname), people with the surname Levy or Lévy
 Levy Adcock (born 1988), American football player
 Levy Barent Cohen (1747–1808), Dutch-born British financier and community worker
 Levy Fidelix (1951–2021), Brazilian conservative politician, businessman and journalist
 Levy Gerzberg (born 1945), Israeli-American entrepreneur, inventor, and business person
 Levy Li (born 1987), Miss Malaysia Universe 2008–2009
 Levy Mashiane (born 1996), South African footballer
 Levy Matebo Omari (born 1989), Kenyan long-distance runner
 Levy Mayer (1858–1922), American lawyer
 Levy Middlebrooks (born 1966), American basketball player
 Levy Mokgothu, South African footballer
 Levy Mwanawasa (1948–2008), President of Zambia from 2002
 Levy Nzoungou (born 1998), Congolese-French rugby player, playing in England
 Levy Rozman (born 1995), American chess IM, coach, and content creator
 Levy Sekgapane (born 1990), South African operatic tenor
 Levy Lee Simon, American playwright, actor, director and screenwriter
 Levy Solomons (1730–1792), British-Canadian merchant and fur trader
 Levy Thorpe (1889–1935), English footballer
 Levy Tran (born 1983), American actress and model
 Levy Yakete (1965–2014), Central African Republic politician
 Levy baronets, extinct title in the Baronetage of the United Kingdom

Places 

Levy, Missouri, a community
Levy, South Carolina, an unincorporated community
Levy County, Florida
Levy Island, Crystal Sound, Antarctica

Military organizations 
A levy (plural levies) is a military force raised ("levied") in a particular manner. In the Roman legion this typically means "farmer soldier" militia units raised by conscription that provided most of light and heavy infantry composition—most of which were of poor training and little fighting ability—but not always. In the British Empire, levies were units raised by local officials for local tasks, typically for local order and security.
 Conscript forces
 Feudal levies a form of medieval conscription
 Shire levy, a means of military recruitment in medieval England
Opolchenie, a Russian version of medieval conscription
 Levée en masse, mass conscript armies, especially that of Revolutionary France
Volkssturm, a Nazi-German organized conscription during (last days of) WWII
 Locally raised forces within the British Empire
 Aden Protectorate Levies (became Federal Regular Army of the South Arabian Federation, which then became the army of the People's Republic of South Yemen)
 Iraq Levies
 Kachin Levies
 Pakistan Levies
 Balochistan Levies
 Malakand Levies
 Swat Levies
 Dir Levies
 Trucial Oman Levies (became Union Defence Force of the UAE)

Compulsory government measures 
 To force someone into military or national service by means of conscription
 Feudal levies a form of medieval conscription
 Shire levy, a means of military recruitment in medieval England
 A legal action, where property of a judgment debtor is taken for public sale to satisfy a monetary judgment
 An imposition of a fine
 To take money in order to pay off a tax liability
 To wage war
 The statutory levy collected from bookmakers in the UK by the Horserace Betting Levy Board
 Private copying levy, a tax on recordable media typically allocated to the developers of "content"
E-levy, proposed tax bill in Ghana

Businesses 

Levy Restaurants, brand in the United States and Canada
 Levy's (department store), former Arizona chain
Léon & Lévy, French makers of stereoscopic views and postcards
 Henry S. Levy and Sons, former Brooklyn bakery
Levy & Klein, former architectural firm in Chicago
 Michel Lévy Frères, Parisian publishing house

Other uses
 3673 Levy, an asteroid
 USS Levy (DE-162), destroyer escort

See also 
Levy House (disambiguation)
Clan MacLea/Livingstone (name)
 Levi (disambiguation)
 Levin (disambiguation)
 Levee (disambiguation)
 Justice Levy (disambiguation)